Eastphalian, or Eastfalian, is a dialect of West Low German, spoken in southeastern parts of Lower Saxony and western parts of Saxony-Anhalt in Germany.

Geographical extent
The language area between the Weser and Elbe rivers stretches from the Lüneburg Heath in the north to the Harz mountain range and Weser Uplands in the south. It comprises Hanover Region, Brunswick and Calenberg Land as well as the Magdeburg Börde, including the cities of Hanover, Braunschweig, Hildesheim, Göttingen and Magdeburg. It roughly corresponds with the historic region of Eastphalia.

Classification
Eastphalian as a separate dialect was determined by 19th century linguistics, tracing it back to Old Saxon variants spoken in eastern parts of the medieval stem duchy of Saxony. Towards the Elbe region in the southeast, the language area is increasingly influenced by the High German consonant shift.

Subdivisions
 Elbe Eastphalian (around Oschersleben and Haldensleben in the Magdeburg Börde between Helmstedt and Magdeburg)
 Göttingisch-Grubenhagensch (around Göttingen, Northeim and Osterode am Harz
 Heide Eastphalian (around Celle, with Northern Low Saxon elements)
 Central Eastphalian is the Eastphalian subdialect spoken in a large area surrounding Braunschweig and Hanover.
 Hildesheimsch (from around Hildesheim and Peine up to Braunschweig)
 Hannoversch (in the city of Hannover)
 Calenbergsch (west of Hannover)
 Einbecksch (around Einbeck)
 Bronswieksch (in the city of Braunschweig)

References

External links

Low German
German dialects
Languages of Germany
Saxony-Anhalt
Culture of Lower Saxony
Culture in Braunschweig